Da Gama Dam, is an earthfill/gravity-type dam on the Witwaters River, near White River, Mpumalanga, South Africa. It was established in 1971 and its main purpose is for irrigation. Its hazard potential has been ranked to be high.

See also 
List of reservoirs and dams in South Africa
List of rivers of South Africa

References 

 List of South African Dams from the Department of Water Affairs and Forestry (South Africa)

Dams in South Africa
Dams completed in 1971